The speaker of the Lagos State House of Assembly is the presiding officer of the Lagos State House of Assembly, elected by its membership. The Speaker is second in line of succession to the Lagos State governorship, after the deputy governor. The Speaker also represents the members of his or her constituency. Since inauguration of the state house of assembly on 2 October 1979, there have been 9 legislative assemblies with 7 representatives holding the office of Speaker. The current Speaker is Rt. Hon. Mudashiru Obasa who was elected on 8 June 2015.

History

List of Speakers
Source: Lagos State House of Assembly

List of Deputy Speakers

References

1979 establishments in Nigeria
State lower houses in Nigeria
Speakers of the Lagos State House of Assembly